The Portable People Meter (PPM), also known as the Nielsen Meter, was a system developed by Arbitron (now Nielsen Audio) to measure how many people are exposed, or listening to individual radio stations and television stations. This also includes cable television. The PPM is worn like a pager, and detects hidden audio tones within a station or network's audio stream, logging each time it finds a signal. 

There are several parts to the PPM system:
An encoder that inserts the tones subliminally into a station's or broadcast network's airchain via psychoacoustic masking;
A monitor that checks that the encoder is working properly;
The wearable Portable People Meter carried by each panelist;
A base station for each PPM, where each panelist in the household places it overnight to recharge the battery; and
A portable charger for vacations and other trips away from the home base.

The original PPM concept required the base station to be connected to a telephone line to transmit panelists' listening data from the PPM to the collection point. The PPM 360, introduced in 2010, uses cellular telephone technology to accomplish this without the need for a wired telephone service. They also have a motion sensor to detect when the PPM is being worn by an active person. After a period of 30 minutes of inactivity, they go into a low-power "sleep" mode to conserve battery life.

History

The original concept for the PPM can be traced to a brainstorming session at Arbitron in November 1988. Concerns over the forthcoming move from analog video to high-definition digital television had engineers concerned that the technology then in use would become obsolete overnight. Drawing upon his experience in testing laboratories, Dr. Gerald Cohen proposed embedding an identifying signal in the audio and later decoding it. Dr. Cohen argued that audio was less likely to undergo as drastic a change in content and technology as would video, hence any technology developed would likely not become obsolete in a few years.

The concept was presented to the company and also written up in a short concept document. A preliminary investigation was undertaken, but the technology was never given serious consideration. The concept was written off and forgotten, as Arbitron had larger issues in its competition with the Nielsen Company for television ratings. After losing to Nielsen Company, Arbitron went back to its core business—radio ratings.

Dr. Cohen's idea lay dormant until 1992, when Dr. Richard Schlunt and Dr.Patrick Nunally approached Arbitron. Meeting with Ronald Kolessar the Director of Technology, Dr. Cohen and others presented a new variation of the idea—selectively embed a code into the frequency spectrum of the baseband audio stream and use digital signal processing in a small wearable device to recover the embedded code buried in what a person watches or hears.

Convinced that the concept could be achieved, Mr.Kolessar obtained denial from Arbitron's management to undertake a fast-track effort to determine feasibility. Lacking the internal expertise to do so, additional outside help from the company Martin Marietta was sought. Facing cutbacks in the defense industry, Martin Marietta agreed to take on commercial business even to the point of signing away all rights to the technology they were to develop.

Now that Dr. Cohen's idea was a full-fledged project with management support, engineers at Arbitron focused on improving the encoding and detection methodology and miniaturization into a hand-held device. Additional capabilities such as motion detection were added later on.

In 2008, EE Times, as part of their Great Minds, Great Ideas project, profiled Mr. Kolessar as the "Inventor of the Portable People Meter".

Research reports
Arbitron, as well as other firms that provide research and consulting services to radio stations, have begun publishing numerous studies based on analysis of PPM data.

Although the PPM delivers empirical, verifiable audience measurement data, these results are sometimes at odds with the results generated with the diary method. (The diary method asks listeners to note each change of their radio dial.) Some minority diarists may have used their diaries as a way to support and show loyalty for stations that targeted their communities. Around 2008, the Spanish Radio Association (SRA) and a number of politicians challenged Arbitron and the PPM's accuracy in measuring minority listening.

Criticism
Although the makers of the PPM claim that it is more accurate than traditional alternatives like handwritten logs or wired meters, critics have raised issues about its accuracy. Another sales argument is that the device is immune to human forgetfulness, something that can be an issue in studies that rely on self-reporting by test subjects.

Some radio producers have seen their audience numbers plummet in cities where Arbitron adopted the PPM. Arbitron settled with five states that brought discrimination suits and promised more representative sampling. Radio host Delilah blamed the device for "horrendous" damage to her measured audience numbers. One potential culprit raised by critics is the psychoacoustic masking techniques used to embed the signal; Delilah, for example, has suggested that the masking causes the signal to get lost in certain styles of music, thus not getting picked up by the PPM and artificially lowering the radio station's listenership.Nielsen introduced eCBET in 2016, which they touted as an enhancement for the tone encoding process. Consequently, there have been some complaints from some in the radio industry that the upgrade caused the audio to sound harsh and unlistenable.

See also
 Numeris
 Single-source data

References

External links
PPM at Arbitron (archived version at the Wayback Machine, 2011)
Nielsen Audio
Study on the impact of commercials on radio audiences on the Coleman Insights site

Audience measurement
Broadcasting
Market research
American inventions